The Security Intelligence Agency (abbr. BIA) is a national intelligence agency of Serbia. The agency is responsible for collecting, reporting and disseminating intelligence, and conducting counter-intelligence in the interest of Serbia's national security.

History
The Security Intelligence Agency (BIA) was formed on 1 August 2002 as the successor of State Security Service (SDB), which existed from 1991 to 2002.

Its function is similar to that of the CIA in the United States or the   SVR in the Russian Federation.

2017–present
In May 2017, Bratislav Gašić, former Minister of Defence and close associate of outgoing Prime Minister and newly elected President, Aleksandar Vučić, was appointed as the head of the Security Intelligence Agency. Following his appointment, Gašić suspended his activities in the ruling Serbian Progressive Party (SNS).

In August 2017, an amendments to the Law on the Security and Information Agency, which strengthen the authorities of the agency's director, have arrived in the National Assembly for adoption. This move was condemned by several officials including the Commissioner for Information of Public Importance Rodoljub Šabić and former co-Minister of Internal Affairs Božo Prelević. They have stated that these amendments are unconstitutional and thus way creating a platform for "party's intelligence agency" of SNS, aimed at the opposition and citizens opposed to the ruling regime.

Directors
Source: 

 Status

In popular culture
Serbian TV series Državni službenik follows the work of one BIA field agent.
Documentary TV series produced by Radio Television of Serbia Tajne službe Srbije explores the history and lives of notable people during the history of the Agency.
 Novel Služba (English: Service) by the former BIA agent Goran Živaljević

See also
 Military Intelligence Agency (VOA)
 Military Security Agency (VBA)
 Intelligence and Reconnaissance Directorate
List of intelligence agencies

References

External links
 Official website

2002 establishments in Serbia
Government agencies established in 2002
Counterintelligence agencies
Serbian intelligence agencies
Law enforcement in Serbia
Domestic intelligence agencies